Melittomma sericeum, the chestnut timberworm, is a species of ship-timber beetle in the family Lymexylidae. It is found in North America.

References

 Wheeler, Quentin D. (1986). "Revision of the genera of Lymexylidae (Coleoptera: Cucujiformia)". Bulletin of the American Museum of Natural History, vol. 183, no. 2, 113–210.
 Young, Daniel K. / Arnett, Ross H. Jr., Michael C. Thomas, Paul E. Skelley, and J. H. Frank, eds. (2002). "Family 71. Lymexylidae Fleming 1821". American Beetles, volume 2: Polyphaga: Scarabaeoidea through Curculionoidea, 261–262.

Further reading

 Arnett, R.H. Jr., M. C. Thomas, P. E. Skelley and J. H. Frank. (eds.). (2002). American Beetles, Volume II: Polyphaga: Scarabaeoidea through Curculionoidea. CRC Press LLC, Boca Raton, FL.
 Arnett, Ross H. (2000). American Insects: A Handbook of the Insects of America North of Mexico. CRC Press.
 Richard E. White. (1983). Peterson Field Guides: Beetles. Houghton Mifflin Company.

Lymexylidae

Beetles of the United States
Beetles of North America
Beetles described in 1841